Escazú is a district of the Escazú canton, in the San José province of Costa Rica.

Geography 
Escazú has an area of  km² and an elevation of  metres.

It is located on the northeast slopes of the Cerros de Escazú, 9 kilometers west of the national capital city of San José, and lies in the center of the canton, limiting west to Santa Ana Canton, north to San Rafael district and south to San Antonio district.

Demographics 

For the 2011 census, Escazú had a population of  inhabitants.

The area is inhabited primarily by upper-mid to high income families, and known in the Costa Rican collective consciousness as home to the country's economic elite. Escazu is the wealthiest and most prominent city in the country catering to wealthy Americans and Europeans as well as wealthy locals. 

Escazú has a relatively large Jewish population, and several synagogues.

Climate
The climate is mostly tropical: it is not unknown for Escazú to experience rainfall on a day in which San José is dry and sunny. November and December frequently bring high winds.

Economy
Escazú is one of the most affluent places in Costa Rica, with many expensive restaurants and shops, and has some of the most exclusive shopping and dining venues in the country. It has commercial developments, like Avenida Escazú, which holds the country's first IMAX theater. Avenida Escazú is a modern outdoor mall/center. This mall has many international brands like Max Mara, Women's Secret, Cortefiel, and Adolfo Dominguez, the country's first Starbucks, a Crate and Barrel, and a campus of Texas Tech University. Another unique feature of Escazu is that it is home to one of the most luxurious malls in Costa Rica,
Multiplaza Escazu, with stores from large international brand names like Zara, Armani Exchange, MNG, Guess, Lacoste, Tiffany and Co., Carolina Herrera, Salvatore Ferragamo, H&M, among others.

Locations
Many locations in the city are prized for their scenic outlooks. This zone is one of the most developed parts in the metropolitan area, populated by families with high incomes. Escazú contains many apartment blocks and residential areas.

Over the past couple of decades, Escazú has become an expatriate enclave: several embassies have their residences located here, including the residence of the US Ambassador, Dutch, British, German, Canadian, and South Korean Ambassadors. The past few years have seen a significant influx of newly arrived foreigners from North America, South America and Europe. It is home to many bars and restaurants, especially those of the more chic (and expensive) variety. Rents and prices reflect this and Escazú is one of the most well-known upscale locations in Costa Rica. The city offers many venues that are English speaking oriented like movie theaters, health clinics, business centers and a luxury country club.

Transportation

Road transportation 
The district is covered by the following road routes:
 National Route 105
 National Route 177

Sports
The football soccer club Brujas F.C. was born here. The name of the team "Brujas" is a reference to the nickname of the city "La ciudad de las brujas" (The City of the Witches). However, the team moved in 2009 to Desamparados.

References 

Districts of San José Province
Populated places in San José Province